Edessa bifida is a species of stink bug in the family Pentatomidae. It is found in the Caribbean, Central America, North America, and South America. Some have proposed elevating the preexisting subgenus Ascra to genus status, thereby reclassifying E. bifida as Ascra bifida.

References

Pentatomidae
Hemiptera of South America
Hemiptera of Central America
Hemiptera of North America
Insects described in 1832
Taxa named by Thomas Say
Articles created by Qbugbot